Topi Lehtipuu (born 24 March 1971 in Brisbane, Australia) is a Finnish operatic tenor. He has sung a variety of roles from different periods, including the title role in Benjamin Britten's Albert Herring at the Finnish National Opera, several roles in Mozart operas, including Belmonte in Die Entführung aus dem Serail and  Tamino in Die Zauberflöte, both at the Théâtre des Champs-Elysées in Paris, and Ferrando in Così fan tutte at the 2006 Glyndebourne Festival. He has also appeared in Handel's Ariodante (Paris Opera), as Hylas in Berlioz' Les Troyens (conducted by John Eliot Gardiner), and the Creature in the 2019 world première of Mark Grey's Frankenstein at La Monnaie in Brussels. He has worked with other well-known conductors, such as William Christie, Michel Corboz, René Jacobs, Simon Rattle, and Christophe Rousset. Since 2010 Lehtipuu has been the artistic director of Turku Music Festival.

He has also sung concert repertoire including works by J. S. Bach, Monteverdi, Pärt, Rameau, Rautavaara, Schoenberg, and Stravinsky.

Lehtipuu received his musical education at the Sibelius Academy in Helsinki and has studied with Peter Lindroos, Howard Crook, and Elisabeth Werres.

At the time of his studies, Lehtipuu was an integral member of the acclaimed Finnish progressive rock band Höyry-kone.

Recordings
 Arie Per Tenore  I Barocchisti dir. Diego Fasolis, Naive, 2010.
 Ariodante by George Frideric Handel. Joyce DiDonato, Karina Gauvin, Sabina Pue'rtolas, Marie Nicole Lemieux, Topi Lehtipuu, Matthew Brook, Anicio Zorzi Giustiniani, Il Complesso Barocco dir. Alan Curtis, Virgin Classics, 2011.

References

External links
 Biography

1971 births
Living people
Finnish operatic tenors
Contemporary classical music performers
Sibelius Academy alumni
Musicians from Brisbane
21st-century Finnish male opera singers